American hip hop recording artist Arturo Molina, Jr., professionally known by his stage name Frost, has released thirteen solo studio albums, three collaborative albums, being a part of Latin Alliance and Latino Velvet, six compilation albums and one remix album.

Albums

Studio albums

Collaboration albums

Compilation albums

Remix albums

Singles

Guest appearances

References

External links

Hip hop discographies
Discographies of American artists